Mount Timothy Ski Area is a small ski area located in the South Cariboo region of British Columbia, Canada, 30 km north of 100 Mile House and 18 km northeast of Lac La Hache

The area has a triple chairlift (the first in the south Cariboo), t-bar, platte lift and 2 Magic Carpet beginner lifts and has a vertical drop of 284m from a summit elevation of 1654m to a base elevation of 1370m. 35 runs range from Double black diamond to beginner terrain.

References
Mount Timothy Ski Area website

Geography of the Cariboo
Ski areas and resorts in British Columbia
Interior Plateau